Lasha Gudaevich Pipia (27 December 1975 – 30 July 2021) was a Russian judoka.

Achievements

References

External links 
 

1975 births
2021 deaths
Russian male judoka
Russian sportspeople of Georgian descent
People from Zugdidi